Wakefield Hall is located in Ashland, Wisconsin.

History
Wakefield Hall was originally built to be a new library for Northland College. Its exterior was based on George Washington's birthplace. Plans were made in advance for the building to be converted into offices once the college needed a bigger library.

The plans came to fruition in 1969, when a new library opened and this building was turned into administrative offices. Currently, it houses the admissions office. It was added to the State and the National Register of Historic Places in 1995.

References

Office buildings on the National Register of Historic Places in Wisconsin
Libraries on the National Register of Historic Places in Wisconsin
School buildings on the National Register of Historic Places in Wisconsin
National Register of Historic Places in Ashland County, Wisconsin
Northland College (Wisconsin)
Georgian Revival architecture in Wisconsin
Brick buildings and structures
Library buildings completed in 1941